The 2023 Summit League men's basketball Tournament is the postseason men's basketball tournament for the Summit League for the 2022-23 season. All tournament games will be played at the Denny Sanford Premier Center in Sioux Falls, South Dakota, from March 3-7, 2023.

Seeds
All ten conference teams will participate in the tournament following a change announced before the season began. This will be the first year that St. Thomas will participate in a Division I conference tournament in any sport. Teams are seeded by record within the conference, with a tiebreaker system to seed teams with identical conference records. The tiebreakers operate in the following order:
 Head-to-head record
 Record against the top-seeded team not involved in the tie, going down through the standings until the tie is broken

If a team that is not eligible for the NCAA Tournament wins the Summit League Tournament, the conference's automatic bid goes to the highest seeded postseason eligible team.

Schedule and results

Bracket

Source:

All-Tournament Team
The following players were named to the All-Tournament team:

References

Summit League men's basketball tournament
Basketball competitions in Sioux Falls, South Dakota
2022–23 Summit League men's basketball season
College basketball tournaments in South Dakota
Summit League men's basketball tournament
Summit League men's basketball tournament